Christoph Brüllmann (born 14 January 1958) is a Swiss sailor. He competed in the Tornado event at the 1984 Summer Olympics.

References

External links
 

1958 births
Living people
Swiss male sailors (sport)
Olympic sailors of Switzerland
Sailors at the 1984 Summer Olympics – Tornado
Place of birth missing (living people)